Burkina Faso, also known by its short-form name Burkina, is a landlocked country in West Africa around  in size. Burkina Faso is part of the West African Monetary and Economic Union (UMEOA) and has thus adopted the CFA Franc, which is issued by the Central Bank of the West African States (BCEAO), situated in Dakar, Senegal. There is mining of copper, iron, manganese, gold, cassiterite (tin ore), and phosphates.

Notable firms 
This list includes notable companies with primary headquarters located in the country. The industry and sector follow the Industry Classification Benchmark taxonomy. Organizations which have ceased operations are included and noted as defunct.

See also
 Economy of Burkina Faso
 Trade unions in Burkina Faso
 List of airlines of Burkina Faso
 List of banks in Burkina Faso

References 

Companies of Burkina Faso
Economy of Burkina Faso
 
Burkina Faso